Events from 2020 in the Northern Mariana Islands.

Incumbents 

 Governor: Ralph Torres
 Lieutenant Governor: Arnold Palacios

Events 
Ongoing – COVID-19 pandemic in the Northern Mariana Islands

 28 March – The islands confirmed their first two COVID-19 cases.

Deaths

References 

2020 in the Northern Mariana Islands
2020s in the Northern Mariana Islands
Years of the 21st century in the Northern Mariana Islands
Northern Mariana Islands